The New Zealand national cricket team toured Australia in the 1980–81 season and played 3 Test matches.  Australia won the series 2–0 with one match drawn. This was followed by a one-day series, which included the match that featured the underarm incident.

Test series summary

First Test

Second Test

Third Test

External sources
 CricketArchive – tour summaries

Annual reviews
 Playfair Cricket Annual 1981
 Wisden Cricketers' Almanack 1981

Further reading
 Chris Harte, A History of Australian Cricket, Andre Deutsch, 1993
 

1980 in Australian cricket
1980 in New Zealand cricket
1980–81 Australian cricket season
1981 in Australian cricket
1981 in New Zealand cricket
International cricket competitions from 1980–81 to 1985
1980-81